Daniel Landin BSC, is a British cinematographer.

Landin started working with Super 8 and VHS video in 1978, collaborating with the industrial music group Throbbing Gristle, documenting live performances and art events.  In 1979, he formed the experimental militant classicist group ‘Last Few Days’ with Simon Joyce and Keir Fraser, a highly conceptual collective whose primary aim was live performance in unconventional venues (chapels, cinemas, burger bars, silos, tunnels etc.). Recording was a secondary priority and was mainly live, apart from the ‘Polavision’ soundtrack produced by Cabaret Voltaire at their Western Works in Sheffield 1982.

As the performances became more ambitious, visual imagery became intrinsic to the events, and working on Super 8 and 16mm, Landin created films which were projected during performances. Confrontational events were staged at which synchronised films which were simultaneously projected onto multiple screens to accompany challenging and provocative live music. This work continued and lead to performing with William Burroughs and Brion Gysin at The Final Academy (Brixton Ritzy 1982). Further collaborations led to ‘The Occupied Europe Tour’, a collaboration between Last Few Days and Yugoslavia’s Laibach in 1983. (11 countries in Eastern and Western Europe). This experience of working extensively in the Socialist Bloc, and the study of Hungarian Language subsequently led to a commission co-writing The Rough Guide to Eastern Europe, (Routledge and Keegan Paul 1985) which was the first guide for the independent traveler in what was then a relatively unknown and misunderstood region.

Returning to the UK in 1985, Daniel Landin studied Fine Art Film and Video at St Martins School of Art, whilst working as a camera assistant and film extra (including a 3-month stretch in Kubrick’s Full Metal Jacket). After graduating,  Daniel Landin directed several short films, including ‘A Broken Spine’, ‘Ring of Fire’ (with Kate Cragg), ‘Thou Pluckest Me Out Screaming’ and ‘The Child and the Saw’ (with Richard Heslop) (1st Prize ‘Golden Dancer’ Huesca Film Festival 1987), exhibiting at numerous festivals including Berlin Film Festival (Panorama)1986,1989,1990, Edinburgh and London. In 1986 Landin directed the film Procar in collaboration with Heslop and Herbert Verhey for live performances in Amsterdam with the Car Ensemble of the Netherlands. The film Procar later appeared in the programme of the Internationale Filmfestspiele Berlin 1987 with a remastered audio recording of the Car Ensemble as soundtrack.

In 1986 Landin directed the short film for Laibach's Drzava, a filmed performance of Laibach and Michael Clark at Saddlers Wells, London, based on Clark’s No Fire Escape In Hell.

In 1994 he was commissioned to make ‘Laibach, A Film From Slovenia’ dir Daniel Landin & Peter Vezjak, Chris Bohn. This documentary researched and illustrated the complex polemic of Laibach, and pivoted around the radical philosopher Slavoj Zizek.

Landin began working as a Cinematographer in 1991, initially shooting short films and music videos (The Verve, Oasis, Blur, Pulp, Massive Attack, Björk, Franz Ferdinand, Rolling Stones, P. J. Harvey, David Bowie, Madonna Cher, etc.), and many TV and cinema commercials (Stella Artois, Armani, Sony, BMW, Guinness, Nintendo, Levis, Wrangler, PlayStation, Nike etc.).  Following a commission as DoP for Alexander McQueen on his only directing venture (‘Alarm Call’ - Björk 1996), Landin worked in a highly collaborative role with Alexander McQueen as Lighting Designer, working on virtually all of McQueen’s highly conceptual Fashion Shows in London, Paris and New York unit 2009.

Using cinema in live events has continued to be an important interest, and in 2012 Landin collaborated with Danny Boyle on the “Isles of Wonder” London 2012 Olympic Opening Ceremony shooting staged components for projection and simultaneous broadcast. 

Director of Photography credits include the following Feature Films:
 'Ray and Liz'  (dir. Richard Billingham) 2018

 'The Yellow Birds' (dir. Alexandre Moors) 2017 (Winner : Best Cinematography US Dramatic, Sundance Film Festival 2017)

 ‘Under The Skin’ (dir. Jonathon Glazer) 2013  (Winner : Cinematography Prize Dublin International Film Festival 2014) 

 ‘44 inch Chest’  dir: Malcolm Venville,  Anonymous Content UK 2010 
(winner Jury Prize Seville Film Festival.) 

 ‘The Uninvited’  dir: The Guard Bros,  DreamWorks USA 2008

 ‘Sixty Six’  dir: Paul Weiland,  Working Title UK 2006

and shorts:

 ‘The Organ Grinder’s Monkey’  (dir The Chapman Brothers) 2011 Warp films
 ‘Kismet Diner’  dir Mark Nunneley 2013
 ‘This Isn’t Happening’  dir Thomas Carty Gorgeous Films 2012
 Unkle ‘Follow Me Down’  dir Warren du Preez and Nick Thornton Jones 2010
 ‘Starry Night’, dir: Ben Miller 2005
 ‘Shell’ dir: Kate Cragg (Best Director, International Film Festival Buenos Aires) 2002
 ‘Baby’  dir: Wiz (Special Mention 3rd International Film Festival Buenos Aires) 2001
 ‘The Loved’ dir Nichola Bruce 1998

as well as additional photography credits on ‘Sexy Beast’ dir Jonathan Glazer, ‘Snatch’ dir. Guy Ritchie and ‘Keen Eddie’ dir. Simon West.

Landin is a member of the British Society of Cinematographers, and cinematography awards include: Best Cinematography US Dramatic, Sundance Film Festival 2017, Cinematography Prize Dublin International Film Festival 2014, Gold ‘Clio’ for Cinematography (2003), D&AD Cinematography Pencil ( 3 x: 2003,2007, 2009) and the Cinematography Gold Creative Circle (2001, 2006), as well as becoming an AICP Honouree in the USA (2005).

Filmography

Short films

Music videos

Other credits

References

Landin, Daniel
Landin, Daniel
Landin, Daniel
Landin, Daniel
British cinematographers